The 1984 season was Molde's 10th season in the top flight of Norwegian football and their first since their promotion from 2. divisjon in 1983. This season Molde competed in 1. divisjon (first tier) and the Norwegian Cup.

In the league, Molde finished in 8th position, 11 points behind winners Vålerengen.

Molde participated in the 1984 Norwegian Cup. They were knocked out by Rosenborg in the Fourth Round. The team lost 2–7 at Molde Stadion and were eliminated from the competition.

Squad
Source:

Friendlies

Competitions

1. divisjon

Results summary

Positions by round

Results

League table

Norwegian Cup

Squad statistics

Appearances and goals

 
 
 

|}

Goalscorers

See also
Molde FK seasons

References

External links
nifs.no

1984
Molde